This article is about the particular significance of the year 2007 to Wales and its people.

Incumbents
First Minister – Rhodri Morgan
Secretary of State for Wales – Peter Hain
Archbishop of Wales – Barry Morgan, Bishop of Llandaff
Archdruid of the National Eisteddfod of Wales – Selwyn Iolen

Events
2 January - A survey finds that eight of the top ten "unhealthiest places to live" in the UK are in Wales, with Merthyr Tydfil leading the list.
12 January - Welsh actor Michael Sheen is nominated for a BAFTA award for Best Supporting Actor in a Film (for his performance as Tony Blair in The Queen).
16 January - It is announced that a £14 billion training academy for all three armed forces is to be built at St Athan in south Wales.
30 January - Connie Fisher wins the Critics' Circle Most Promising Newcomer Award.
1 February - Travel Magazine names Oxwich beach the most beautiful in Britain.
7 February - A letter bomb is sent to the main Driver and Vehicle Licensing Agency centre in Swansea, south Wales. Four workers are taken to Morriston Hospital in Swansea, including a woman with cuts to her hands and body.
9 February - Unpredicted snow storms wreak havoc across the country. 602 schools and many more business forced to close. Traffic is heavily disrupted. Parts of the M4 motorway temporary close and 500 people are trapped in cars on the A48 between Carmarthen and Cross Hands.
12 February - A report by the National Trust reveals that more than 70% of the coastline in Wales, including 143 miles of coastline, is under threat from coastal erosion and flooding.
22 February - It is confirmed that Prince Harry, the son of the Prince of Wales, will be serving with his regiment in Iraq.
February - A lightning strike severely damages Llandaff Cathedral organ.
March - Llwynywermod estate in the Brecon Beacons is purchased by the Duchy of Cornwall to provide a Welsh residence for the Prince of Wales (now Charles III).
1 April - Prescription charges are abolished for NHS patients in Wales.
2 April - Smoking ban comes into force in all enclosed public places.
4 May - In the elections for the National Assembly for Wales, Labour suffer a net loss of three seats, Plaid Cymru make a net gain of three seats, and all other parties retain the same number of seats as before the election. Labour no longer have an overall majority.  Alun Pugh becomes the only Assembly minister to lose his seat, defeated by Conservative Darren Millar.  Labour defector John Marek loses his seat to his former constituency secretary, Lesley Griffiths.  Plaid Cymru's Mohammad Asghar becomes the first Assembly member from an ethnic minority.
8 May - First public flight on the publicly subsidised air service between the new Anglesey Airport and Cardiff International Airport.
16 May - It is announced that Prince Harry will not, after all, be serving with his regiment in Iraq.
26 May - It is announced that the Military Cross awarded to Siegfried Sassoon will go on display at the Royal Welch Fusiliers museum in Caernarfon.
4 June - Claire Jones is appointed official harpist to the Prince of Wales
17 June - Paul Potts, from Port Talbot, wins the national final of Britain's Got Talent.
27 June - One Wales agreement between Welsh Labour Party and Plaid Cymru.
July - The International Eisteddfod at Llangollen is the best-attended since the event began, with ticket sales up 11% on the previous year.
26 July - Efforts to save the life of Shambo, a black Friesian bull living at the Hindu Skanda Vale Temple near Llanpumsaint, finally fail and the bull is put down after testing positive for tuberculosis.
4–11 August - The National Eisteddfod of Wales is held at Mold, Flintshire.
14 September - Ioan Gruffudd marries Alice Evans.
17 September - Five people are killed in a two-car collision on the M4 motorway at Newport.
30 September - Unveiling of the first Welsh national memorial to the Falklands war takes place in Cardiff.
16 October - Houses are evacuated when part of the Monmouthshire & Brecon Canal's bank collapses at Gilwern.

Arts and literature

Awards
National Eisteddfod of Wales: Chair - T. James Jones
National Eisteddfod of Wales: Crown - Tudur Dylan Jones
National Eisteddfod of Wales: Prose Medal - Mary Payne
National Eisteddfod of Wales: Drama Medal - Nic Ros
Wales Book of the Year:
English language: Lloyd Jones, Mr Cassini
Welsh language: Llwyd Owen, Ffydd Gobaith Cariad
Dylan Thomas Award:
BBC Cardiff Singer of the World competition:
Main Prize - Shenyang
Song Prize - Elizabeth Watts
Glyndŵr Award - Shani Rhys James
Cân i Gymru: Einir Dafydd and Ceri Wyn Jones - "Blwyddyn Mas"

New books

Welsh language
Tony Bianchi - Pryfeta
Mererid Hopwood - Ar Bwys
Watcyn L Jones - Cofio Capel Celyn
Gareth Miles - Y Proffwyd a’i Ddwy Jesebel
Mary Annes Payne - Rhodd Mam

English language
Phil Carradice - People’s Poetry of the Great War
Grahame Davies - Real Wrexham
Peter Ho Davies - The Welsh Girl
Eirian Jones - The War of the Little Englishman: Enclosure Riots on a Lonely Welsh Hillside
Owen Sheers - Resistance
J. P. R. Williams - Given the Breaks: My Life in Rugby

Music

Albums
The Gentle Good - Dawel Disgyn (EP)
Aled Jones - Reason To Believe
Karl Jenkins - This Land of Ours (with the Cory Band and Cantorion)
Katherine Jenkins - Viva
Kelly Jones - Only the Names Have Been ChangedNatasha Marsh - AmourPaul Potts - One ChanceGruff Rhys - CandylionLisa Scott-Lee - Never and NowStereophonics - Pull the PinBryn Terfel - A Song in My HeartElin Manahan Thomas - Eternal LightWaka Flocka Flame - FlockaveliFilm

Broadcasting
3 January - Ian Watkins, better known as "H" from Steps, becomes an entrant in the fifth UK series of Celebrity Big Brother. On the same day, he announces he is gay.
18 January - S4C introduces a new corporate logo and brand.
14 July - Radio Tircoed begins broadcasting on a permanent basis as a community radio station.
8 October - BBC Radio Cymru relaunches its C2 youth and music output.
29 November - XFM South Wales launches.

 Welsh-language television Codi Canu English-language television Coal House (documentary series)
Keith Allen stars as the Sheriff of Nottingham in a second series of Robin Hood.Coming HomeGavin & Stacey, starring Ruth Jones, Joanna Page and Rob BrydonGlyn's Virgin Voters, one-off documentary featuring Glyn Wise

Sport
17 January - ISPAL (Institute for Sport, Parks and Leisure) is officially launched.
17 March - Wales defeat England in their final match of the 2007 Six Nations Championship, to finish fifth in the final table (beating Scotland only on overall points difference).
10 May - The James Bevan Trophy is launched, to commemorate the Australian-born Welsh-raised man who was the first ever captain of the Wales rugby team.
3 June - Wales reach the semi-finals of the World Sevens (rugby union) tournament at Murrayfield.
19 June - Darren Morgan wins the European Masters snooker championship.
July - The Welsh Super Cup (football) is scheduled to be held at Aberystwyth.
3 August - Wales are defeated 62-5 by England in a warm-up match for the Rugby World Cup.
29 September - Wales lose to Fiji in their decisive Group B match, and thus fail to reach the quarter-finals of the Rugby World Cup.
29 September - Wales wins the gold medal at the European Mixed Curling Championships in Madrid, Spain. The Welsh team of Adrian Meikle (skip), Lesley Carol (third), Andrew Tanner (second), Blair Hughes (lead) and Chris Wells (alternate) took the Gold Medal in a thrilling Final against Denmark.
BBC Wales Sports Personality of the Year – Joe Calzaghe

Births
20 September - Ruby Megan Henson, to Wales' celebrity couple, Charlotte Church and Gavin Henson
17 December - James, son of Prince Edward and Sophie (then Earl and Countess of Wessex). The child is given his father's subsidiary title of "Viscount Severn" as a courtesy title, in recognition of his mother's Welsh ancestry. (Prince Edward, Sophie and James have since become Duke and Duchess of Edinburgh, and Earl of Wessex {by courtesy}, respectively.)

Deaths
4 January - Gren, cartoonist, 72
12 January - Berwyn Jones, athlete, 66
14 January - Peter Prendergast, painter, 60
21 January - Peter Clarke, Children's Commissioner for Wales, 58
24 January - David Morris, MEP and peace activist, 76
30 January - Griffith Jones, actor, 97
6 February - Sir Gareth Roberts, physicist, 66
7 February - Brian Williams, Welsh international rugby player, 44
10 February - Bill Clement, Welsh international rugby player and Secretary of the WRU, 91
21 February - John Robins, rugby player, 80
22 February - Edgar Evans, opera singer, 94
1 April - Ivor Wynne Jones, journalist, 80
3 April - Marion Eames, novelist, 85
12 April
Len Hill, sportsman, 65
Maldwyn Jones, historian, 84
13 April - Tony Goble, artist, 63
22 May - Ifor Owen, illustrator, 91
11 June - Mercer Simpson, writer, 81
12 June - Colin Fletcher, backpacker and writer, 85
12 August - Alwyn Rice Jones, former Archbishop of Wales and Bishop of St Asaph, 73
16 August
Will Edwards, politician, 69
Roland Mathias, poet, 91
6 September - Byron Stevenson, footballer, 50
9 September
Steve Jones, rugby player, 55
Sir Tasker Watkins, VC, 88
14 October - Carol Evans, cricketer, 68
31 October (in Málaga) - Ray Gravell, rugby player and radio presenter, 56
15 November - W. S. Jones, author, 87
December
Ron Davies, footballer, 75
Richard Williams, conductordate unknown'' - Norman Harris, rugby player

See also
2007 in Northern Ireland

References